The Samsung Galaxy Z Flip 4 (stylized as Samsung Galaxy Z Flip4, sold as Samsung Galaxy Flip 4 in certain territories) is a foldable smartphone that is part of the Samsung Galaxy Z series. It was announced at the August 2022 edition of Galaxy Unpacked alongside the Galaxy Z Fold 4. It was released on August 25, 2022.

Design 

The Z Flip 4 uses the same clamshell design as the Z Flip with an aluminum frame, it has 6.7-in display protected by ultra-thin glass made by Samsung that can be folded into a space of 4.2-in. Once it is folded, the Samsung logo shows up by the center of the hinge. It also adopts 1.9 inch cover screen. This change in cover screen enables users to download widgets such as music, weather, alarm, timer, voice recorder, today's schedule, Samsung Health, and bluetooth.

The Samsung Galaxy Z Flip 4 is available in four colors: Graphite, Pink Gold, Bora Purple and Blue.

Specifications

Hardware 
The Galaxy Z Flip 4 has two screens: its foldable inner 6.7-inch display with a 120 Hz variable refresh rate and its 1.9-inch cover display.

The device has 8 GB of RAM, and either 128 GB, 256 GB or 512 GB of UFS 3.1 flash storage, with no support for expanding the device's storage capacity via micro-SD cards.

The Z Flip 4 is powered by the Qualcomm Snapdragon 8+ Gen 1.

The device's included battery is a 3700 mAh dual-cell unit that fast charges via USB-C up to 25 W, or via wireless charging up to 10 W.

The Z Flip 4 features two rear cameras, including a 12 MP wide-angle camera and a 12 MP ultra-wide camera. It has a 10 MP front-facing camera at the top of the display.

Software 
The Samsung Galaxy Z Flip 4 ships with Android 12 based One UI 4.1.

References

External links 
 

Samsung Galaxy
Android (operating system) devices
Foldable smartphones
Flip phones
Mobile phones introduced in 2022
Flagship smartphones
Samsung smartphones